The Daily Mash is a left wing  British satirical website providing parodic commentary on current affairs and other news stories. Neil Rafferty (a former political correspondent for The Sunday Times) and Paul Stokes (former business editor of The Scotsman), created the website in 2007 and remain the lead writers. Both writers earn salaries from the enterprise and also employ freelance contributors. The publication has garnered praise for its absurd, scatological humour and insightful political satire. The current editor is comedy writer and former BBC journalist Tim Telling. The Daily Mash has often been compared to the US publication The Onion.

History 
The Daily Mash was launched in April 2007 by journalists Paul Stokes and Neil Rafferty. Stokes is a former business editor of The Scotsman and has also written for Scotland on Sunday and The Daily Record. Rafferty is a former political correspondent for The Sunday Times, has also written for the Press Association and Business AM, and is a former spokesman for the smokers’ lobby group FOREST. The site was originally inspired by The Onion, a US satirical publication, as Stokes and Rafferty saw a gap in the market for a similar publication in Britain. Both journalists worked mainly for Scottish newspapers.

Stokes and Rafferty earn salaries from the site, and lead a small team of freelance writers. The site earns revenue through advertising and merchandise, and is a successful profit-making enterprise. It presents a niche opportunity to advertisers because of its apparent target audience of procrastinating office workers (Citi employees complained to The Daily Mash and independent publications after the company banned them from accessing the site).

Highlights of the publication's first year have been published in book form as Halfwit Nation: Frontline Reporting from the War on Stupid, both to acclaim and to complaints of unintelligent, overly crude humour.

According to an online survey, the site's readership mainly consists of university graduates who also read newspapers such as The Independent, The Guardian and The Times. According to the same survey, 65 per cent of its readers have incomes of more than £30,000, with 22 per cent earning more than £70,000.

In March 2019, Digitalbox plc acquired Mashed Productions Limited, owners of the Daily Mash.

The Mash Report 
In July 2017, a TV show spin-off of The Daily Mash, titled The Mash Report first aired on BBC Two. Its first series comprised ten episodes, and it ran for four series.

Reception 
The Daily Mash provides parodic coverage of current affairs and other stories and has been described as the U.K.'s leading satirical news website. The site satirises with Guardianesque centre left humour hence its significant student appeal.  The site's humour has been described as "cruel," "scatological," "absurd" and "irreverent." It is considered a British alternative and upstart rival to the better known US publication The Onion and its coverage has been compared favourably and in some instances considered superior to that of the latter. Despite its humour, the site is considered to be insightful on occasion. Some critics have remarked that not all of the site's articles succeed as satire, and that its content lacks the linguistic invention of some other satirical works.

The Daily Mash's stories are sometimes commented upon by other news publications. Acclaimed parodic coverage includes Jeremy Clarkson's much-publicised disparaging remarks aimed at Gordon Brown, the advertising deals of Team Great Britain's medal winners, the nationalisation of Northern Rock, Gordon Brown meeting the Pope and bankers' bonuses.

See also
 List of satirical magazines
 List of satirical news websites
 List of satirical television news programs
 Disassociated Press

References

External links
 

British satirical websites
Internet properties established in 2007
2007 establishments in the United Kingdom